Andrew Schloss ( Walter Andrew Schloss; born 1952 Hartford, Connecticut) is an American musician and computer engineer.

Career
Schloss is perhaps best known for his work with the radiodrum, a three-dimensional midi-controller. Schloss is a pioneer in computer-music technology, and worked at IRCAM and the CCRMA in the 1980s. He has performed with Léon Theremin, Laurie Anderson, Tito Puente, Chucho Valdés, David A. Jaffe and Peter Brook. He has collaborated extensively with David A. Jaffe, who has composed a variety of works for him, including "The Seven Wonders of the Ancient World," for radiodrum-performed Disklavier and ensemble. Schloss teaches at the University of Victoria and heads the Music Computer Science joint degree program.

Schloss earned a PhD in 1985 from Stanford University, where he worked at CCRMA – the Center for Computer Research in Music and Acoustics.

Selected technography 

<li> 
<li> 
<li> Part 1: "Sonata "Sacre"
<li> Part 2: "The Most Religious"
<li> Part 3: "Reversed Orbits"
<li> Part 4: "Oracular and Prophetic"
<li> Part 5: "Edible Trance"
Centaur CRC 2190
Discogs release ID 1773079.
Allmusic album ID mw0001371262.

Bibliography

Notes

References

  (article).

 

 .

Primary sources

External links

Discogs artist ID 1773079.

1952 births
Video game musicians
Living people
Place of birth missing (living people)
Video game composers
American electronic musicians